In historical linguistics, the Ingvaeonic nasal spirant law (also called the Anglo-Frisian or North Sea Germanic nasal spirant law) is a description of a phonological development that occurred in the Ingvaeonic dialects of the West Germanic languages. This includes Old English, Old Frisian, and Old Saxon, and to a lesser degree Old Dutch (Old Low Franconian).

Overview

The sound change affected sequences of vowel + nasal consonant + fricative consonant. ("Spirant" is an older term for "fricative".) The sequences in question are -ns-, -mf-, and -nþ-, preceded by any vowel. The nasal consonant disappeared, sometimes causing nasalization and compensatory lengthening of the vowel before it.

The sequence -nh- had already undergone a similar change in late Proto-Germanic several hundred years earlier, and affected all Germanic languages, not only the Ingvaeonic subgroup (see Germanic spirant law). The result of this earlier change was the same: a long nasal vowel. In Old English and Old Frisian, rounding occurred here as well, giving  in both cases. It was this earlier shift that created the n/∅ in think/thought and bring/brought.

Examples
Compare the first person plural pronoun "us" in various old Germanic languages:
{|
| 
 Gothic uns
 Old High German uns (dative) or unsih (accusative)
 Old Dutch uns
| 
 Old English ūs
 Old Frisian ūs
 Old Saxon ūs (accusative also unsik)
|}

Gothic represents East Germanic, and its correspondence to German and Standard Dutch shows it retains the more conservative form.  The /n/ has disappeared in English, Frisian, Old Saxon (New Low German has both us and uns), and dialectal Dutch with compensatory lengthening of the /u/. This phenomenon is therefore observable throughout the "Ingvaeonic" languages. It does not affect High German, East Germanic or North Germanic.

Likewise:
 Germanic *tanþs  >  English tooth, North Frisian tôs, toss (vs. Low German Tähn, Dutch, Danish, and Swedish tand, German Zahn, Icelandic tönn).
 Germanic *anþeraz  >  English other, Icelandic aðrir, West Frisian oar, West Flemish (Frans-Vlaams) aajer, Old Saxon ōðar, āthar (vs. Low German anner, German/Dutch ander [þ > d], Icelandic: annað/annar/önnur, Swedish annat/annan/andre/andra, Danish anden/andet/andre).
 Germanic *gans  >  English goose, West Frisian goes, guos, Low German Goos (vs. Dutch gans, German Gans).
 Germanic *fimf  >  English five, West Frisian fiif, East Frisian fieuw, Dutch vijf, Low German fiew, fiev, fief (vs. German fünf, Icelandic fimm, Danish and Swedish fem).
 Germanic *samftō, -ijaz  >  English soft, West Frisian sêft, Low German sacht, Dutch zacht [ft > xt] (vs. German sanft).

English
English shows the results of the shift consistently throughout its repertoire of native lexemes. One consequence of this is that English has very few words ending in -nth; those that exist must have entered the vocabulary subsequent to the productive period of the nasal spirant law:
month - derives from Old English  (compare German ); the intervening vowel rendered the law inapplicable here.
tenth - from Middle English .  The original Germanic , which was regularised to *tehunþô in early Ingvaeonic, was affected by the law, producing Old English ,  (Modern English tithe). But the force of analogy with the cardinal number ten caused Middle English speakers to recreate the regular ordinal and re-insert the nasal consonant.
plinth - a loanword in Modern English from Greek ( "brick, tile").
amaranth - a double loanword from Greek, "ἀμάραντος" (undying) + "ἄνθος" (flower).
Likewise, the rare occurrences of the combinations -nf-, -mf- and -ns- have similar explanations.
answer - originally had an intervening stop: Old English , cf. Dutch antwoord, German Antwort.
unfair - the prefix un- is still productive.

Dutch
Although Dutch is based mostly on the Hollandic dialects, which in turn were influenced by Frisian, it was also heavily influenced by the Brabantian dialect which tends not to show a shift. As a result, the shift is generally not applied but is still applied to some words. For example Dutch vijf vs. German fünf, zacht vs. sanft. Coastal dialects of Dutch tend to have more examples, e.g. standard Dutch mond "mouth" vs. Hollandic mui (earlier muide) "slit between sandbanks where tidal streams flow into". Brabantian dialects tend to have fewer examples, having unshifted examples in a few cases where standard Dutch has the shift, as in the toponyms Zonderwijk (Veldhoven), Zondereigen (Baarle-Hertog), etc. cognate to standard Dutch zuid "south".

German
The spirant law was originally active in Central Franconian dialects of High German, which is proof that it was not entirely restricted to Ingvaeonic. Compare for example Luxembourgish  ("us"), Gaus ("goose", now archaic). Modern Standard German is based more on eastern varieties which are not affected by the shift. The standard language does, however, contain a number of Low German borrowings with it. For example Süden ("south", ousting Old High German ), or sacht ("soft, gentle", alongside native sanft).

In some High and Highest Alemannic German dialects, there is a similar phenomenon called Staub's law, for example  ("us", Standard German uns), füüf ("five", Standard German fünf), or treiche ("drink", Standard German trinken).

References
 Bremmer Jr, Rolf H. An Introduction to Old Frisian. History, Grammar, Reader, Glossary. (Amsterdam and Philadelphia: John Benjamins, 2009.)
 Markey, Thomas L. Germanic dialect grouping and the position of Ingvæonic.(Inst. f. Sprachwissenschaft d. Univ. Innsbruck, 1976.) 
 Ringe, Donald R. and Taylor, Ann (2014). The Development of Old English - A Linguistic History of English, vol. II, 632p. . Oxford.

West Germanic languages
Language histories
Old English
Sound laws